Jean Étienne Pezant (1811–1880) was a New Zealand missionary and priest. He was born in Chanonat, near Clermont-Ferrand, France in 1811. In New Zealand, he signed documents with John Stephen Pezant. He retired in Blenheim, and was buried in Picton.

References

1811 births
1880 deaths
French emigrants to New Zealand
French Roman Catholic missionaries
19th-century New Zealand Roman Catholic priests
Roman Catholic missionaries in New Zealand
People from Blenheim, New Zealand